(spelled  or Fuhrer when the umlaut is not available) is a German word meaning "leader" or "guide". As a political title, it is strongly associated with the Nazi dictator Adolf Hitler, who officially styled himself der Führer und Reichskanzler (the Führer and Chancellor of the Reich) after the death of President Paul von Hindenburg and the subsequent merger of the offices of Reichspräsident and Reichskanzler. 

However, because of its strong association with Hitler, the isolated word itself usually has negative connotations when used with the meaning of "leader", especially in political contexts. 

The word  has cognates in the Scandinavian languages, spelled fører in Danish and Norwegian, which have the same meaning and use as the German word, but without necessarily having political connotations. In Swedish, förare normally means "driver" (of a vehicle). However, in the compound word härförare, that part does mean "leader", and is a cognate of the German "Heerführer".

History

Background 
 has been used as a military title (compare Latin Dux) in Germany since at least the 18th century. The usage of the term "Führer" in the context of a company-sized military subunit in the German Army referred to a commander lacking the qualifications for permanent command. For example, the commanding officer of a company was (and is) titled "Kompaniechef" (literally, Company Chief), but if he did not have the requisite rank or experience, or was only temporarily assigned to command, he was officially titled "Kompanieführer". Thus operational commands of various military echelons were typically referred to by their formation title followed by the title , in connection with mission-type tactics used by the German military forces.

Origins of the political concept 
According to historian Richard J. Evans, this use of "" by Schönerer's Pan-German Association, probably introduced the term to the German far-right, but its specific adoption by the Nazis may also have been influenced by the use in Italy of "", also meaning "leader", as an informal title for Benito Mussolini, the Fascist Prime Minister, and later (from 1922) dictator, of that country.

of the Nazi Party 
Adolf Hitler took the title to denote his function as the head of the Nazi Party; he received it in 1921 when, infuriated over party founder Anton Drexler's plan to merge with another antisemitic far-right nationalist party, he resigned from the party. Drexler and the party's Executive Committee then acquiesced to Hitler's demand to be made the chairman of the party with "dictatorial powers" as the condition for his return.

and Chancellor

A month later, the decision to vote with the Nazi Party taken by the MPs of the Catholic Center Party allowed the Nazi-dominated Reichstag to reach the qualified constitutional two-thirds majority required for passage of the Enabling Act allowing the cabinet to promulgate laws by decree, rendering in practice the system of checks and balances defunct. The Act became the official legal justification for such decrees later routinely issued by Hitler himself.

and Chancellor of the German Reich
One day before Hindenburg's death, Hitler and his cabinet decreed the "Law Concerning the Highest State Office of the Reich," which stipulated that upon Hindenburg's death, the office of the president was to be merged with that of Chancellor. Thus, upon Hindenburg's death, Hitler became  – although eventually  was quietly dropped from day-to-day usage and retained only in official documents. Hitler therefore assumed the President's powers without assuming the office itself – ostensibly out of respect for Hindenburg's achievements as a heroic figure in World War I. The Enabling Act had specifically prohibited legislation that would affect the position or powers of the Reich President, but the first one-party Reichstag elected in November 1933 had passed an act on the first anniversary of Hitler’s appointment as Chancellor, 30 January 1934, abolishing those restrictions. It was then approved by a referendum on 19 August.

and Chancellor of the Greater German Reich
The title was changed on 28 July 1942 to "" (Leader and Chancellor of the Greater German Reich).

and Supreme Commander of the Wehrmacht 

According to the Constitution of Weimar, the President was Supreme Commander of the Armed Forces. Unlike "President", Hitler did take this title for himself. When conscription was reintroduced in 1935, Hitler created the title of Commander-in-Chief of the Armed Forces, a post held by the Minister for War. He retained the title of Supreme Commander for himself. Soldiers had to swear allegiance to Hitler as "" (Leader of the German Reich and Nation). Field Marshal Werner von Blomberg, then the Minister of War and one of those who created the Hitler oath, or the personal oath of loyalty of the military to Hitler, became the Commander-in-Chief of the Armed Forces while Hitler remained Supreme Commander. Following the Blomberg–Fritsch Affair in 1938, Hitler assumed the commander-in-chief's post as well and took personal command of the armed forces.  However, he continued using the older formally higher title of Supreme Commander, which was thus filled with a somewhat new meaning. Combining it with "Führer", he used the style  (Leader and Supreme Commander of the ), yet a simple "Führer" after May 1942.

of the German Reich and Nation 
Soldiers had to swear allegiance to Hitler as "" (Leader of the German Reich and Nation).

Germanic  and the planned  of the Greater Germanic Reich 

An additional title was adopted by Hitler on 23 June 1941 when he declared himself the "Germanic Führer", in addition to his duties as Führer of the German state and people. This was done to emphasize Hitler's professed leadership of what the Nazis described as the "Nordic-Germanic master race", which was considered to include peoples such as the Norwegians, Danes, Swedes, Dutch, and others in addition to the Germans, and the intent to annex these countries to the German Reich to form the Greater Germanic Reich. Waffen-SS formations from these countries had to declare obedience to Hitler by addressing him in this fashion. On 12 December 1941 the Dutch fascist Anton Mussert also addressed him as such when he proclaimed his allegiance to Hitler during a visit to the Reich Chancellery in Berlin. As late as 1944, however, occasional propaganda publications continued to refer to him by this unofficial title.

One of the Nazis' most-repeated political slogans was  – "One People, One Empire, One Leader". American historian  says the slogan "left an indelible mark on the minds of most Germans who lived through the Nazi years. It appeared on countless posters and in publications; it was heard constantly in radio broadcasts and speeches." The slogan emphasized the absolute control of the leader over practically every sector of German society and culture – with the churches being formally the most notable exception. The designation  itself was initially used only in the context of the Nazi Party, though its meaning gradually sprawled to cover the German state, the German Armed Forces, the German nation and ultimately all the Germanic peoples. 

Hitler's word became in practice absolute and ultimate, even when incompatible the Constitution, as he saw himself as the sole source of power in Germany, similar to the Roman emperors and German early medieval leaders. In spite of that, he took great care to maintain the pretence of legality of his dictatorship. He issued thousands of decrees that were based explicitly on the Reichstag Fire Decree. That decree itself was based on Article 48 of the constitution, which gave the president the power to take measures deemed necessary to protect public order. The Enabling Act was renewed in 1937 for four years and again in 1939 for four years by the Reichstag. In 1943, it was extended indefinitely by a decree from Hitler himself. Those extensions by the Reichstag were merely a formality with all other parties having been banned.

However, Hitler had a narrow range of interest – mostly involving diplomacy and the military – and so his subordinates interpreted his vaguely formulated orders and wishes in a manner beneficial to their own interests or those of their organizations. This led to vicious power wrangles that were immensely beneficial to Hitler in aiding him to ensure that no subordinate amassed enough power to challenge or jeopardize his absolute rule.

Usage in lower ranks of Nazi Germany
Regional Nazi Party leaders were called , "" also  meaning "leader". The word  was also a generic word referring to any commander or leader of troops and could be applied to NCOs or officers at many different levels of command. Under the Nazis, the title  was also used in paramilitary titles (see Freikorps).

Modern German usage 

In Germany, the isolated word "" is usually avoided in political contexts, due to its intimate connection with Nazi institutions and with Hitler personally. However, the suffix  is used in many compound words.

However, the word  ("leader of the (parliamentary) opposition") is more commonly used.

See also 

Terms derived from 
 
 
 Deputy Führer
 
 Führer Headquarters
 

 
 Führer Directives
 
 
 
 

Other
 
 
 
 President for life
 

 
 Supreme Leader (disambiguation)
 Vozhd
 
 List of German expressions in English

References

External links 
 

Adolf Hitler
Authoritarianism
Dictatorship
Fascism
Heads of government
Heads of state
Nazism
Government of Nazi Germany
Positions of authority
Titles of national or ethnic leadership
German words and phrases
Nazi terminology